Swingin' My Way Through College (subtitled Maynard Ferguson and His Orchestra Play for Dancing) is an album released by Canadian jazz trumpeter Maynard Ferguson featuring tracks recorded in late 1958 and originally released on the Roulette label.

Reception

Allmusic awarded the album 2 stars.

Track listing
 "Don'cha Go 'Way Mad" (Illinois Jacquet, Jimmy Mundy, Al Stillman) - 2:43
 "That Old Feeling" (Sammy Fain, Lew Brown) - 3:43
 "What's New?" (Bob Haggart, Johnny Burke) - 3:10
 "Dancing in the Dark" (Arthur Schwartz, Howard Dietz) - 2:02
 "Bittersweet" (Willie Maiden) - 3:10
 "Love Walked In" (George Gershwin, Ira Gershwin) - 3:17
 "It's a Pity to Say Goodnight" (Billy Reid) - 2:27
 "B. J.'s Back in Town" (Maiden) - 3:07
 "Tenderly" (Walter Gross, Jack Lawrence) - 3:38
 "Bye Bye Blackbird" (Ray Henderson, Mort Dixon) - 2:58
 "They Can't Take That Away from Me"  (George Gershwin, Ira Gershwin) - 3:07

Personnel 
Maynard Ferguson - trumpet, valve trombone
Bill Chase, Larry Moser, Jerry Tyree - trumpet
Slide Hampton, Don Sebesky - trombone
Jimmy Ford - alto saxophone
Carmen Leggio, Willie Maiden - tenor saxophone
John Lanni - baritone saxophone
Bob Dogan - piano 
Jimmy Rowser - bass  
Frankie Dunlop - drums
Bill Holman, Slide Hampton, Willie Maiden, Don Sebesky - arrangers

References 

1959 albums
Albums produced by Teddy Reig
Maynard Ferguson albums
Roulette Records albums